"Love Is the Look" is the fourth single from Kristine W's 2009 album The Power of Music. The single went to number one on the Billboard Hot Dance Club Play chart on April 25, 2009. It was Kristine W's thirteenth number one on the U.S. dance chart.

Track listing
 U.S. Maxi CD 
"Love Is the Look" (Love To Infinity If Hooks Could Kill Radio) (3:56)
"Love Is the Look" (Rosario K-Y® INTRIGUE™ Radio) (3:52)
"Love Is the Look" (Deepswing's Runway Glide Radio) (3:58)
"Love Is the Look" (Mr. Mig's Looking Like Love Radio) (3:53)
"Love Is the Look" (Massi & De Leon Full-On Vocal Radio) (4:10)
"Love Is the Look" (Tod Miner's Elektro Radio) (3:53)
"Love Is the Look" (Love To Infinity If Hooks Could Kill Club) (7:01)
"Love Is the Look" (Rosario K-Y® INTRIGUE™ Club) (7:32)
"Love Is the Look" (Deepswing's Runway Runway Glide Mix) (7:57)
"Love Is the Look" (Mr. Mig's Looking Like Love Club) (5:49)
"Love Is the Look" (Massi & De Leon Full-On Vocal Mix) (8:59)
"Love Is the Look" (Tod Miner's Elektro Hot Wheels Club) (7:34)

See also
List of number-one dance singles of 2009 (U.S.)

References

2009 singles
Kristine W songs
Songs written by Kristine W
2009 songs